Émile Genevois (1 January 1918 – 19 September 1962) was a French film actor. Genevois appeared in over ninety films and television programmes, generally in character roles.

Selected filmography

References

Bibliography
 Cardullo, Bert. Vittorio De Sica: Actor, Director, Auteur. Cambridge Scholars Publishing, 2009.
 Holmstrom, John. The Moving Picture Boy: An International Encyclopaedia from 1895 to 1995, Norwich, Michael Russell, 1996, pp. 84–85.

External links

1918 births
1962 deaths
French male film actors
20th-century French male actors